Costanzo Balleri (20 August 1933 – 2 November 2017) was an Italian football player and coach, who played as a defender.

His son David Balleri was also a professional footballer.

References

External links

1933 births
2017 deaths
Italian footballers
Serie A players
U.S. Livorno 1915 players
S.P.A.L. players
Torino F.C. players
Inter Milan players
Modena F.C. players
Montevarchi Calcio Aquila 1902 players
Italian football managers
U.S. Livorno 1915 managers
Montevarchi Calcio Aquila 1902 managers
A.C. Perugia Calcio managers
Association football defenders
Sportspeople from Livorno